Ryan Lee Hudson (born 20 November 1979), also known by the nicknames of "Raz", and "Hudders", is an English former professional rugby league footballer who played in the 1990s, 2000s and 2010s. He is also the brother of former Coronation Street and Wild at Heart actress Lucy-Jo Hudson.

Hudson was set to play for Bradford Bulls in 2005 but failed a substance test after taking some pain-killers abroad that contained the banned substance stanozolol. He was suspended from the game for two years; the ban expired shortly before the start of 2007's Super League XII.

Early career
As a youngster, he played for amateur side Stanley Rangers, whom he later went on to coach. Whilst at the club his potential was obvious. He picked up several player of the year awards and is regarded as one of the club's finest ever products.

International honours
In October 2001, Hudson was named as captain for England under-21s two-game tour against South Africa.

County honours
Ryan Hudson won a cap playing  for Yorkshire while at Castleford as the captain in the 56–6 victory over Lancashire at Odsal Stadium, Bradford on 2 July 2003.

Post playing career
Outside of Rugby League, he has an endorsement deal with Maximuscle. Hudson also co-owns a gym in Castleford with former Featherstone Rovers player Jamie Field, he is also a coach at Stanley Rangers ARLFC.

References

External links
Statistics at thecastlefordtigers.co.uk

1979 births
Living people
Bradford Bulls players
Castleford Tigers captains
Castleford Tigers players
Doping cases in rugby league
English rugby league players
English sportspeople in doping cases
Huddersfield Giants players
People educated at Garforth Academy
Rugby league hookers
Rugby league second-rows
Rugby league five-eighths
Rugby league locks
Rugby league players from Leeds
Wakefield Trinity players
Yorkshire rugby league team players